Jean-Pierre Hautier (18 October 1955 – 12 October 2012) was a Belgian television presenter and broadcaster for RTBF.

Hautier was known for his long-time commentary for RTBF viewers on the Eurovision Song Contest which he has done since the 1994 Contest after the regular commentator Claude Delacroix got promoted to the head of Belgian radio. In addition Hautier has co-commentated the event with Sandra Kim at the 1996 Contest and was until his death hosting the contest with Jean-Louis Lahaye which he has done since the 2007 Contest.

He was the president of La Première Radio.

References

External links
 Jean-Pierre Hautier speaks about Eurovision to BBC News
 
  Jean-Pierre Hautier Biography at moustique

1955 births
2012 deaths
Mass media people from Brussels
Belgian television presenters
Belgian radio presenters
Belgian television journalists
Belgian radio journalists
Belgium in the Eurovision Song Contest